The 1952 National Invitation Tournament was the 1952 edition of the annual NCAA college basketball competition.  The 1952 tournament was won by La Salle University.  Tom Gola and Norm Grekin were co-MVPs.

Selected teams
Below is a list of the 12 teams selected for the tournament.

 Dayton
 Duquesne
 Holy Cross
 La Salle
 Louisville
 NYU
 St. Bonaventure
 St. John's
 Saint Louis
 Seattle
 Seton Hall
 Western Kentucky

Bracket
Below is the tournament bracket.

See also
 1952 NCAA basketball tournament
 1952 NAIA Basketball Tournament

References

National Invitation
National Invitation Tournament
1950s in Manhattan
Basketball in New York City
College sports in New York City
Madison Square Garden
National Invitation Tournament
National Invitation Tournament
Sports competitions in New York City
Sports in Manhattan